Rimgaila "Rima" Salys is Professor Emerita of Russian Program at the University of Colorado Boulder and an expert in 20th century Russian literature, film, and culture. Her research interests include  Soviet and post-Soviet cinema, 20th century Russian art and culture, theory and praxis of literary modernism, and Soviet cinematic musical.

Of note is her research in the history of the Patterson family of black expatriates in the Soviet Union, which included James Patterson, who played the black baby boy in the famous soviet musical Circus.

She graduated from the University of Pennsylvania and Harvard University in Slavic Languages and Literatures.

From 1994 to 2014 she taught at the University of Colorado Boulder, where she served as Associate Chair for Russian and Interim Chair for Germanic and Slavic Languages and Literatures.

Books
1999: Leonid Pasternak: The Russian Years (1875–1921), 2 vols, Oxford University Press
2009: The Musical Comedy Films of Grigorii Aleksandrov: Laughing Matters, University of Chicago Press books
 The book discusses films Jolly Fellows, Circus, Volga-Volga, and Tanya. "Salys explores how Aleksandrov’s cinema preserved the paradigms of the American musical, including its comedic tradition, using both to inscribe the foundation myths of the Stalin era in the national consciousness."
1999: (editor & contributor) Yuri Olesha. Envy. A Critical Companion
2005: (editor & contributor) Tightrope Walking: The Memoirs of Josephine Pasternak
2013: (editor & contributor) The Russian Cinema Reader, 2 vols.
2015 (editor & contributor) The Contemporary Russian Cinema Reader : 2005–2016,

References

Year of birth missing (living people)
Living people
American people of Lithuanian descent
American literary theorists
Russian studies scholars
University of Colorado Boulder faculty
University of Pennsylvania alumni
Harvard University alumni